Shahr-e Ain (also Romanized as Shahr-e Ā’īn) is a village in Bashtin Rural District, Bashtin District, Davarzan County, Razavi Khorasan Province, Iran. At the 2006 census, its population was 128, in 43 families.

References 

Populated places in Davarzan County